The Peoples of Middle-earth (1996) is the 12th and final volume of The History of Middle-earth, edited by Christopher Tolkien from the unpublished manuscripts of his father J. R. R. Tolkien. Some characters (including Anairë, the wife of Fingolfin) only appear here, as do a few other works that did not fit anywhere else.

Contents
Each volume of The History of Middle-earth bears on the title page spread an inscription by Christopher Tolkien in Fëanorian letters (in Tengwar, an alphabet J. R. R. Tolkien devised for the High-Elves), that describes the contents of the book. The inscription in Volume XII reads: "This is the last volume of the work of Christopher Tolkien in which he has collected a great part of all that his father John Ronald Reuel Tolkien wrote of Middle-earth and Valinor.  In this book is traced the devising of the history of the later ages in the Northwest of Middle-earth after the Great Battle and the Fall of Morgoth."

Part One: The Prologue and Appendices to The Lord of the Rings
This section focuses on covering the development of the Prologue and Appendices of The Lord of the Rings as well as the Akallabêth, along with themes and ideas associated with them. It is by far the most substantial section of the book, consisting of nearly 300 of the book's 480 text pages. It includes early drafts of the novel's Prologue and the appendices on languages, family trees, and calendars, as well as the history of the Akallabêth, "The Tale of Years" (chronologies of the Second and Third Ages), the heirs of Elendil, and the making of Appendix A.

Part Two: Late Writings
Materials mostly postdating 1969, consisting of the essays "Of Dwarves and Men", on the development of the languages of these races; "The Shibboleth of Fëanor", on the linguistics of the Elvish language of Quenya and giving etymologies for the names of the princes of the Noldor; "The Problem of Ros", exploring the suffix "-ros" found in certain names such as Elros and Maedhros; and some "last writings" addressing the subjects of the Istari (Wizards), Glorfindel of Gondolin and Rivendell, and Círdan the Shipwright.

Part Three: The Teachings of Pengoloð
A brief narrative going back to the Book of Lost Tales period, presenting information provided by Pengoloð of Gondolin to Ælfwine of England in regard to the sundering of the Elven tongues.

Part Four: Incomplete Tales
Two stories written in the 1950s.

The New Shadow
"The New Shadow" is a sequel to The Lord of the Rings, set a little over a century later in the time of King Eldarion, Aragorn's son. The editor mentions (p. 409) that Tolkien wrote three versions of the beginning of this story, but all were abandoned after a few pages.

Tal-Elmar
"Tal-Elmar" is set in the Second Age and tells of the Númenórean colonization of Middle-earth from the point of view of the Wild Men. The title character and protagonist, one of the ancient inhabitants of the lands of Gondor, is partly descended from Númenórean settlers.

References

External links

 tolkien-online.com: "An in-depth overview of J.R.R. Tolkien's The Peoples of Middle-earth, the final volume of The History of Middle-earth". 

Middle-earth books
12
1996 books
History of Middle-earth Vol XII: Peoples of Middle-earth, The
Unfinished books
Books published posthumously